The Metro Viet News is a Vietnamese language newspaper based in Philadelphia, Pennsylvania published every Friday to serve the growing Vietnamese population of the Greater Philadelphia area. It is published by New Mainstream Press, Inc. a publishing company that caters specifically to the Asian-American communities. The Metro Viet News is the sister publication of the Metro Chinese Weekly.
The Metro Viet News is most commonly found in Northeast and South Philly, where most of the area's Vietnamese population lives.

History
Following the quick success of the Metro Chinese Weekly, Tsao was convinced to attract Vietnamese readers, the second largest Asian demographic in Philadelphia. The Metro Viet News was originally a monthly publication, but was quickly put into weekly production due to reader response.

References

External links
Company Website

Asian-American culture in Pennsylvania
Newspapers published in Philadelphia
Philadelphia Weekly
Publications established in 2009
Vietnamese-American history
2009 establishments in Pennsylvania